Head of the Harbor is a village in Suffolk County, on the North Shore of Long Island, New York, United States. The population was 1,472 at the time of the 2010 census.

The Village of Head of the Harbor is located entirely within the Town of Smithtown.

History 
Head of the Harbor incorporated as a village in 1928.

Geography

To the north of the village lies Stony Brook Harbor.

Demographics

At the 2000 census, there were 1,447 people, 484 households, and 413 families in the village. The population density was 513.6 people per square mile (198.1/km). There were 501 housing units at an average density of 177.8 per square mile (68.6/km). The racial makup of the village was 95.02% White, 1.24% African American, 3.25% Asian, and 0.48% from two or more races. Hispanic or Latino of any race were 1.38% of the population.

Of the 484 households 38.4% had children under the age of 18 living with them, 77.9% were married couples living together, 4.3% had a female householder with no spouse present, and 14.5% were non-families. 11.4% of households were one person and 3.5% were one person aged 65 or older. The average household size was 2.99 and the average family size was 3.23.

The age distribution was 27.0% under the age of 18, 5.2% from 18 to 24, 25.0% from 25 to 44, 31.2% from 45 to 64, and 11.6% 65 or older. The median age was 41 years. For every 100 females, there were 102.4 males. For every 100 women age 18 and over, there were 101.9 men.

The median household income was $117,450 and the median family income  was $129,157. Males had a median income of $97,095 versus $50,481 for females. The per capita income for the village was $52,999. About 1.2% of families and 1.5% of the population were below the poverty line, including none of those under age 18 and 2.9% of those age 65 or over.

Government 
As of July 2022, the Mayor of Head of the Harbor is Douglas A. Dahlgard, the Deputy Mayor is Daniel W. White, and the Village Trustees are Jeffrey D. Fischer, Judith C. Ogden, and Gordon Van Vechten.

Notable person
Robert Mercer, billionaire hedge fund manager.

References

External links 

 Official website

Smithtown, New York
Villages in New York (state)
Long Island Sound
Villages in Suffolk County, New York
Populated coastal places in New York (state)